Sir Christopher "Kit" William McMahon (born 10 July 1927) is a British banker who was the executive director of the Bank of England from 1970–80 and deputy governor from 1980-86.McMahon was born in Melbourne, Australia, before emigrating to the UK in 1951. 

He has been made a Fellow of Birkbeck after being a Governor of there for at least 12 years.

References 

1927 births
Possibly living people
British bankers
Deputy Governors of the Bank of England
Knights Bachelor